Elections were held in the organized municipalities in the Timiskaming District of Ontario on October 22, 2018 in conjunction with municipal elections across the province.

Armstrong

Source:

Brethour

Casey

Chamberlain

Charlton and Dack

Cobalt

Source:

Coleman

Englehart

Source:

Evanturel

Gauthier

Harley

Harris

Hilliard

Source:

Hudson

James

Source:

Kerns

Kirkland Lake

Source:

Larder Lake

Source:

Latchford

Source:

Matachewan

Source:

McGarry

After a tied vote, and a recount confirmed the tie, a random draw was held to select the mayor, which Matt Reimer won.

Source:

Temiskaming Shores

Source:

Thornloe

References

Timiskaming
Timiskaming District